The following outline is provided as an overview of and topical guide to Burkina Faso:

Burkina Faso – landlocked sovereign country located in West Africa.  It is surrounded by six countries: Mali to the north, Niger to the east, Benin to the south east, Togo, Ghana to the south, and Côte d'Ivoire to the south west. Formerly called the Republic of Upper Volta, it was renamed on August 4, 1984, by President Thomas Sankara to mean "the land of upright people" in Moré and Dioula, the major native languages of the country. Literally, "Burkina" may be translated, "men of integrity," from the Moré language, and "Faso" means "father's house" in Dioula.

General reference

 Pronunciation: ; 
 Common English country name:  Burkina Faso
 Official English country name:  Burkina Faso
 Official language: French
 Common endonym(s): le Burkina, le Faso
 Official endonym(s): le Faso
 Adjectival(s): Burkinabe
 Demonym(s): Burkinabe
 International rankings of Burkina Faso
 ISO country codes: BF, BFA, 854
 ISO region codes: See ISO 3166-2:BF
 Internet country code top-level domain: .bf

Geography of Burkina Faso 

Geography of Burkina Faso
 Burkina Faso is: a landlocked country
 Population of Burkina Faso: 	13,228,000(2005) - 68th most populous country
 Area of Burkina Faso:  - 74th largest country
 Atlas of Burkina Faso

Location 
  Burkina Faso is situated within the following regions:
 Northern Hemisphere and lies on the Prime Meridian
 Africa
 West Africa
 Time zone:  Coordinated Universal Time UTC+00
 Extreme points of Burkina Faso
 High:  Tena Kourou 
 Low:  Black Volta 
 Land boundaries:  3,193 km
 1,000 km
 628 km
 584 km
 549 km
 306 km
 126 km
 Coastline: none

Environment of Burkina Faso 

 Climate of Burkina Faso
 Protected areas of Burkina Faso
 National parks of Burkina Faso
 Wildlife of Burkina Faso
 Fauna of Burkina Faso
 Birds of Burkina Faso
 Mammals of Burkina Faso

Natural geographic features of Burkina Faso 

 Glaciers in Burkina Faso: none 
 Lakes of Burkina Faso
 Rivers of Burkina Faso
 World Heritage Sites in Burkina Faso: The Ruins of Loropéni

Regions of Burkina Faso 

Regions of Burkina Faso

Administrative divisions of Burkina Faso 

Administrative divisions of Burkina Faso
 Regions of Burkina Faso
 Provinces of Burkina Faso
 Departments of Burkina Faso

Regions of Burkina Faso 

Regions of Burkina Faso

Provinces of Burkina Faso 

Provinces of Burkina Faso

Departments of Burkina Faso 

Departments of Burkina Faso

Municipalities of Burkina Faso 

 Capital of Burkina Faso: Ouagadougou
 Cities of Burkina Faso

Demography of Burkina Faso 

Demographics of Burkina Faso

Government and politics of Burkina Faso 

Politics of Burkina Faso
 Form of government: presidential republic
 Capital of Burkina Faso: Ouagadougou
 Elections in Burkina Faso
 Political parties in Burkina Faso

Branches of government

Government of Burkina Faso

Executive branch of the government of Burkina Faso 
 Head of state: President of Burkina Faso
 Head of government: Prime Minister of Burkina Faso

Legislative branch of the government of Burkina Faso 

 National Assembly of Burkina Faso (unicameral)

Judicial branch of the government of Burkina Faso

Foreign relations of Burkina Faso 

Foreign relations of Burkina Faso
 Diplomatic missions in Burkina Faso
 Diplomatic missions of Burkina Faso

International organization membership 
Burkina Faso is a member of:

African, Caribbean, and Pacific Group of States (ACP)
African Development Bank Group (AfDB)
African Union (AU)
African Union/United Nations Hybrid operation in Darfur (UNAMID)
Conference des Ministres des Finances des Pays de la Zone Franc (FZ)
Council of the Entente (Entente)
Economic Community of West African States (ECOWAS)
Food and Agriculture Organization (FAO)
Group of 77 (G77)
International Atomic Energy Agency (IAEA)
International Bank for Reconstruction and Development (IBRD)
International Chamber of Commerce (ICC)
International Civil Aviation Organization (ICAO)
International Criminal Court (ICCt)
International Criminal Police Organization (Interpol)
International Development Association (IDA)
International Federation of Red Cross and Red Crescent Societies (IFRCS)
International Finance Corporation (IFC)
International Fund for Agricultural Development (IFAD)
International Labour Organization (ILO)
International Monetary Fund (IMF)
International Olympic Committee (IOC)
International Organization for Migration (IOM)
International Organization for Standardization (ISO) (correspondent)
International Red Cross and Red Crescent Movement (ICRM)
International Telecommunication Union (ITU)
International Telecommunications Satellite Organization (ITSO)
International Trade Union Confederation (ITUC)

Inter-Parliamentary Union (IPU)
Islamic Development Bank (IDB)
Multilateral Investment Guarantee Agency (MIGA)
Nonaligned Movement (NAM)
Organisation internationale de la Francophonie (OIF)
Organisation of Islamic Cooperation (OIC)
Organisation for the Prohibition of Chemical Weapons (OPCW)
Permanent Court of Arbitration (PCA)
United Nations (UN)
United Nations Conference on Trade and Development (UNCTAD)
United Nations Educational, Scientific, and Cultural Organization (UNESCO)
United Nations Industrial Development Organization (UNIDO)
United Nations Institute for Training and Research (UNITAR)
United Nations Mission in the Sudan (UNMIS)
United Nations Operation in Cote d'Ivoire (UNOCI)
United Nations Organization Mission in the Democratic Republic of the Congo (MONUC)
Universal Postal Union (UPU)
West African Development Bank (WADB) (regional)
West African Economic and Monetary Union (WAEMU)
World Confederation of Labour (WCL)
World Customs Organization (WCO)
World Federation of Trade Unions (WFTU)
World Health Organization (WHO)
World Intellectual Property Organization (WIPO)
World Meteorological Organization (WMO)
World Tourism Organization (UNWTO)
World Trade Organization (WTO)

Law and order in Burkina Faso 

 Constitution of Burkina Faso
 Human rights in Burkina Faso
 LGBT rights in Burkina Faso
 Freedom of religion in Burkina Faso
 Law enforcement in Burkina Faso

Military of Burkina Faso 

Military of Burkina Faso
 Command
 Commander-in-chief:
 Forces
 Army of Burkina Faso
 Navy of Burkina Faso: None
 Air Force of Burkina Faso
 People's Militia
 Regiment of Presidential Security

History of Burkina Faso 

History of Burkina Faso

Culture of Burkina Faso 

Culture of Burkina Faso
 Cuisine of Burkina Faso
 Languages of Burkina Faso
 Media in Burkina Faso
 National symbols of Burkina Faso
 Coat of arms of Burkina Faso
 Flag of Burkina Faso
 National anthem of Burkina Faso
 People of Burkina Faso
 Prostitution in Burkina Faso
 Public holidays in Burkina Faso
 Religion in Burkina Faso
 Christianity in Burkina Faso
 Islam in Burkina Faso
 Ahmadiyya in Burkina Faso
 World Heritage Sites in Burkina Faso: none

Art in Burkina Faso 
 Cinema of Burkina Faso
 Literature of Burkina Faso
 Music of Burkina Faso
 Theatre in Burkina Faso

Sports in Burkina Faso 

Sports in Burkina Faso
 Football in Burkina Faso
 Burkina Faso at the Olympics

Economy and infrastructure of Burkina Faso 

Economy of Burkina Faso
 Economic rank, by nominal GDP (2007): 129th (one hundred and twenty ninth)
 Agriculture in Burkina Faso
 Communications in Burkina Faso
 Internet in Burkina Faso
Currency of Burkina Faso: Franc
ISO 4217: XOF
 Energy in Burkina Faso
 Mining in Burkina Faso
 Stock Exchange in Burkino Faso: none – served by the regional stock exchange Bourse Régionale des Valeurs Mobilières (BRVM) in Abidjan, Cote d'Ivoire.
 Tourism in Burkina Faso
 Transport in Burkina Faso
 Airports in Burkina Faso
 Rail transport in Burkina Faso
 Water supply and sanitation in Burkina Faso

Education in Burkina Faso 

Education in Burkina Faso

Health in Burkina Faso 

Health in Burkina Faso

See also 

Burkina Faso

Index of Burkina Faso-related articles
List of Burkina Faso-related topics
List of international rankings
Member state of the United Nations
Outline of Africa
Outline of geography

References

External links

Premier Ministère official government portal (in French)
allAfrica - Burkina Faso news headline links
Burkina Faso. The World Factbook. Central Intelligence Agency.

Stanford University - Africa South of the Sahara: Burkina Faso directory category
University of Pennsylvania - African Country Studies: Burkina Faso
Paper for All - Non-profit that focuses on education in Burkina Faso
Burkina Faso : Selected web sites

Burkina Faso
Burkina Faso